Scott Ottaway (born 13 May 1972) is an English drummer. He was the drummer for veteran Merseybeat band The Searchers, replacing Eddie Rothe in February 2010, until the band retired in 2019.
Ottaway is also the drummer for The Pocket Gods, an indie band from St Albans. Their last album 100x30 is in the Guinness Book of Records for the most songs on an album. All 100 songs are 30 seconds in length.

References

External links
Official website
Official MySpace

Living people
1970s births
English drummers
British male drummers
21st-century drummers
21st-century British male musicians
The Searchers (band) members